Brandon Banks (born July 13, 1994) is an American football defensive end who is a free agent. He played college football at University of North Carolina at Charlotte. He signed with the Washington Redskins as an undrafted free agent in 2017.

Professional career

Washington Redskins
Banks signed with the Washington Redskins as an undrafted free agent on May 4, 2017. He was waived on September 2, 2017, and was signed to the practice squad the next day. Banks was promoted to the active roster on November 11, 2017. He was waived by the Redskins on November 14, 2017.

Calgary Stampeders
Banks signed with the Calgary Stampeders of the CFL on March 19, 2018. He was placed on the retired list before the start of the season on May 23, and released on August 15.

Indianapolis Colts
On August 23, 2018, Banks was signed by the Indianapolis Colts. He was waived on September 1, 2018.

BC Lions
Banks signed a futures contract with the BC Lions on November 1, 2019. The 2020 CFL season was canceled, and Banks was released on February 3, 2021.

References

External links
Washington Redskins bio
Charlotte 49ers football bio

1994 births
Living people
American football defensive ends
Charlotte 49ers football players
Washington Redskins players
Calgary Stampeders players
Indianapolis Colts players
BC Lions players